Che-Hsuan Lin (born September 21, 1988) is a Taiwanese professional baseball outfielder for the Fubon Guardians of the Chinese Professional Baseball League (CPBL). He played in Major League Baseball with the Boston Red Sox in 2012.

Career
Lin was born in Hualien County, Taiwan. He helped his 12-and-under Bronco League team to the World Championship with a grand slam. He also has played with other Taiwan national teams, including the Junior World Championship squad in 2007.

Boston Red Sox
Lin was acquired by the Boston Red Sox as an international free agent in June 2007. He has put up solid numbers since joining the professional baseball ranks in the United States the same year, being rated as having the best outfield arm in the Boston minor league system, according to Baseball America.  In 2010, Lin was selected as having the best strike-zone discipline, and the best defensive outfielder in Red Sox Top 10 Propspect Scouting Report . Basically a line-drive hitter, he makes good contact – quick, strong wrists – with average gap power, hitting well to all fields. Lin has also been recognized for his solid outfield skills, having good range, enough speed and a hard throwing arm.

Lin played for the GCL Red Sox, Lowell Spinners of the New York–Penn League, Greenville Drive of the South Atlantic League, and Portland Sea Dogs in the Eastern League. He played for the Triple A Pawtucket Red Sox in the International League.

In 2008, Lin was selected for the annual All-Star Futures Game. Lin hit a two-run home run on the first pitch he saw that helped the World team beat the US Team, 3–0. He finished 2-for-2 and was named the game's Most Valuable Player.

In 2008, Lin ranked eighth in the Boston Red Sox prospects list. He also was selected to play in the Olympics for the Chinese Taipei baseball team. He was invited to spring training with the Boston Red Sox in 2010 and 2011.

In , Lin was promoted to Triple-A and played with the Pawtucket Red Sox. To protect him from the Rule 5 draft, he was added to the 40-man roster on November 18, 2011 along with Drake Britton and Will Middlebrooks.

On April 14, 2012, Lin was called up to replace the injured Jacoby Ellsbury. His 9th-inning appearance as a defensive replacement on April 14 made him the eighth player from Taiwan to play in a Major League Baseball game. He was optioned back to Pawtucket after the game. Lin rejoined the Red Sox on May 20 to provide depth in the outfield, with injuries to Cody Ross, Ryan Sweeney and five others on the disabled list. On May 21, Lin recorded his first major league hit off Baltimore Orioles pitcher Troy Patton.

On October 17, 2012, the Red Sox announced that Lin was designated for assignment to make room for right-handed pitcher Sandy Rosario on the Sox's 40-man roster.

Houston Astros
On October 26, 2012, Lin was claimed off waivers by the Houston Astros. On December 19, 2012, Lin was designated for assignment by the Astros and on December 21 he was assigned outright to the Oklahoma City RedHawks. On November 4, 2013, he elected free agency.

Texas Rangers

Lin signed a minor league deal with the Texas Rangers on December 15, 2013. The Rangers intended to use Lin as a pitcher. The Rangers released him on December 23, 2014.

After being released by the Rangers, Lin stated that he would no longer be playing baseball in North America.

EDA Rhinos/Fubon Guardians
Lin joined the EDA Rhinos, later rebranded as the Fubon Guardians, joined the club after he was drafted by them at #1 overall in the 2015 CPBL Draft. In his first campaign with EDA, Lin slashed .244/.359/.372 in 20 games. In 2016, Lin slashed .345/.434/.570 for the Rhinos in 107 games. Lin and the Rhinos won the Taiwan Series in 2016 and Lin was named the MVP of the series. In 2017, the first season with the team as the Fubon Guardians, Lin hit .296/.374/.405 with 3 home runs, 43 RBI, and 9 stolen bases in 91 games. In 2018, Lin played in 106 games for Fubon, hitting .278/.342/.425 with 10 home runs, 59 RBI, and 18 stolen bases.

In 2019 for Fubon, Lin hit .314/.363/.469 with 9 home runs and 48 RBI in 112 games. In the delayed 2020 CPBL season due to the COVID-19 pandemic, Lin hit .291/.392/.455 with 9 home runs and 32 RBI in 73 games for the Guardians. Lin was in the Guardians' starting lineup for Opening Day in 2021. On the season, he posted a slash of .238/.334/.331 with 5 home runs, 23 RBI, and 13 stolen bases in 84 total contests.

Lin made 38 appearances for Fubon in 2022, slashing .244/.321/.319 with one home run, 4 RBI, and 5 stolen bases. On July 26, 2022, Lin suffered a labral tear in his left shoulder while attempting a diving catch against the Wei Chuan Dragons. He was later ruled out for the remainder of the season.

Awards
Boston Red Sox prospects players of the week (July 15–21, 2007)
Boston Red Sox minor leagues defensive player of the month (June 2008)
2008 Futures Game World Team All Star
2008 Futures Game World Team MVP

International career
He was selected Chinese Taipei national baseball team at the 2009 World Baseball Classic, 2013 World Baseball Classic and 2017 World Baseball Classic.

On October 15, 2018, he selected 2018 MLB Japan All-Star Series exhibition game against Japan, but he canceled his participation for Chinese Taipei.

See also

 List of Major League Baseball players from Taiwan

References

External links

, or CPBL
SoxProspects biography

1988 births
Living people
Asian Games medalists in baseball
Asian Games silver medalists for Chinese Taipei
Baseball players at the 2010 Asian Games
Baseball players at the 2008 Summer Olympics
Boston Red Sox players
EDA Rhinos players
Fubon Guardians players
Greenville Drive players
Gulf Coast Red Sox players
Lowell Spinners players
Major League Baseball outfielders
Major League Baseball players from Taiwan
Medalists at the 2010 Asian Games
Oklahoma City RedHawks players
Olympic baseball players of Taiwan
Pawtucket Red Sox players
People from Hualien County
Portland Sea Dogs players
Salem Red Sox players
Taiwanese expatriate baseball players in the United States
2009 World Baseball Classic players
2013 World Baseball Classic players
2017 World Baseball Classic players